Arild Sibbern (27 June 1785 – 11 April 1863) was a Norwegian military officer and representative at the Norwegian Constituent Assembly.

Henrik Frederik Arild Sibbern was born in Rygge in Østfold, Norway. He was admitted to the Royal Danish Military Academy (Hærens Officersskole) in Copenhagen during  1800, and became a military officer in 1803. In 1805, he was commissioned as a teacher at the Army Officers Academ. In 1807, he was promoted to second lieutenant and assigned to the Royal Regiment stationed in Helsingor, Denmark. From 1811 to 1814,  he served in Trondheim, Norway. In 1814 he was assigned to the Norwegian Engineer Brigade in Kristiansand. He represented the Engineering Brigade at the Norwegian Constituent Assembly in Eidsvoll during 1814.

Personal life
He was married to Maren Dorothea Steensen (1798- 1855) with whom he had three children. His family included his brother, Norwegian government minister Valentin Christian Wilhelm Sibbern and his nephew, Norwegian Prime Minister  Georg Sibbern.

Honors
Order of St. Olav 
Order of the North Star 
Order of the Sword

References

1785 births
1863 deaths
Recipients of the Order of the Sword

People from Rygge

Norwegian Army personnel
Norwegian military personnel of the Napoleonic Wars
Fathers of the Constitution of Norway